Richmond Township is one of the nineteen townships of Huron County, Ohio, United States. As of the 2010 census the population of the township was 1,102.

Geography
Located in the southwestern corner of the county, it borders the following townships:
Norwich Township - north
Greenfield Township - northeast corner
New Haven Township - east
Auburn Township, Crawford County - south
Cranberry Township, Crawford County - southwest
Venice Township, Seneca County - west

Richmond Township includes almost all of the county's border with Crawford County.

The city of Willard borders the northeastern side of Richmond Township, and the unincorporated community of Celeryville lies on the township's northeastern border with New Haven Township.

Name and history
Statewide, the only other Richmond Township is located in Ashtabula County.

Richmond Township was organized in 1836.

Government
The township is governed by a three-member board of trustees, who are elected in November of odd-numbered years to a four-year term beginning on the following January 1. Two are elected in the year after the presidential election and one is elected in the year before it. There is also an elected township fiscal officer, who serves a four-year term beginning on April 1 of the year after the election, which is held in November of the year before the presidential election. Vacancies in the fiscal officership or on the board of trustees are filled by the remaining trustees.

References

External links
County website

Townships in Huron County, Ohio
Townships in Ohio